Timbedra Airport  is an airport serving Timbedra in Mauritania.

Airports in Mauritania